was a Japanese commercial photographer who exhibited non-commercial nudes and other work, and later a painter and sculptor.

Life and career

Taiji Arita was born on January 31, 1941, in what is now Kitakyūshū, Japan. After briefly studying law at Chuo University, he opted to instead pursue a career as a photographer and studied under Yasuhiro Ishimoto at Tokyo College of Photography.

From 1964 to 1966 Arita worked at Nippon Design Center; from 1967 to 1977 he freelanced for numerous publishers and the advertising industry, also working as a movie cameraman.

In 1977, Arita published "First Born", a series of monochrome and color images of his first wife and son taken over three years.    That same year, Arita left Tokyo for Ontario. He continued freelance photography for Canadian and Japanese advertising and publishing industries.

In 1980 he returned to Tokyo and opened Arita Studio, specializing in photography for advertising and publishing industries and cinematography for television commercials. Among his photographic assistants was Yoshihiko Ueda.  He married Masako Koiso in 1984.

From about 1980 on, Arita started to paint in oils as well as continuing to be active as a photographer.  In 1988 he published "The Forest of the Naked", a collection of 71 paintings of the human figure in contorted positions. Arita's paintings are similar to his photographs in transforming the physical body into part of an object.

For Arita, art was not just painting, sculpting or photographing, rather it was a way of living. Despite having attained professional acclaim while living in Japan, he became disillusioned. He yearned for a freer existence in which he could create for the sheer joy of creating. In 1991 he left Tokyo for Southern California where he worked as contributing photographer and videographer to Japanese publishers and television broadcasting companies, and began spending more time creating paintings and sculpture.

In 2000, Arita moved to the coastal area of Mendocino County in Northern California to begin a life devoted solely to creation of art with his second wife Masako. There he designed and built a house and studio where he, along with Masako, created his final body of work, "Fruit of the Redwoods" using Coast Redwood salvaged from the remnants of 1000-year-old trees. This project became a point of reference for several of the area's woodworkers, many of whom studied at the Fine Wood Working Program founded by James Krenov.

Arita died in Fort Bragg, California, on July 17, 2011, at 70.  A posthumous printing of Arita's First Born folio was undertaken by Yosihiko Ueda in late 2011 for publication November 2012, with accompanying exhibits in Tokyo and Paris Photo 2012.  Also published in 2012, Pure: Taiji Arita in California: Life and Work, which photographically chronicles the last twenty years of Arita's life.

Solo exhibitions
1977 Fāsuto bōn / "First Born". Ginza Nikon Salon, Tokyo.
1980 Arita Taiji shashinten / "Retrospective". Photo Gallery International, Tokyo.
1982 "The Photographs of Taiji Arita". Photo Gallery International, Tokyo  (photographs)
1982 "18 Paintings". Tokyo Designer's Space, Tokyo (paintings)
1983 Sutorīto faito / "Street Fight". Tokyo Designer's Space, Tokyo (paintings and photographs)
1983 Serufu pōtorēto / "Self Portraits". Polaroid Gallery, Tokyo.
1984 Hyakka ryōran: Nihon no ie / "Extravaganza: Japanese Buildings". Pentax Forum, Tokyo.
1988 Rasha no mori / "Forest of the Naked". Seed Hall, Tokyo (paintings)
1989 Akai tsuchi / "Red Earth". Gallery Face, Tokyo (paintings)
2000 "Forest of the Naked 2". The Loft Gallery, Santa Monica, CA (paintings)
2007 "Ovalism". North Coast Artists Gallery, Fort Bragg, CA (paintings)
2008 "Prime". Art3g, Fort Bragg, CA (paintings and sculpture) 
2009 "Fruit of the Redwoods" (with Masako Arita). Art3g, Fort Bragg, CA (reliefs)

Selected group exhibitions
1978	"Japan: A self portrait", International Center for Photography, New York (photographs)
1986 "Sūpā imēji no sekai" / "Works in 20×24 Polaroid", Seed Hall, Tokyo (photographs)
1991 "Nihon no shashin, 1970 jidai: Tōketsu sareta 'toki' no kioku" / "Japanese Photography in the 1970s: Memories Frozen in Time". Tokyo Metropolitan Museum of Photography
2007	"One" art3g, Fort Bragg, CA (painting)
2007	"The Power of Six", Odd Fellows Hall, Mendocino, CA (sculpture)
2007	"Found Objects", North Coast Artists Gallery, Fort Bragg, CA (sculpture)
2008	"Green Bones" (with Harry Albrecht), art3g, Fort Bragg, CA (paintings) 
2010	"Out of the Woods", NorthCoast Artist Gallery, Fort Bragg CA (reliefs)
2010	"Pas de Deux", Odd Fellows Hall, Mendocino CA (paintings)
2010	"New American Art", Odd Fellows Hall, Mendocino CA (paintings)
2010 "Watakushi o mite: Nūdo no pōtoreito". Tokyo Metropolitan Museum of Photography.
2011	"Work & Love", Mendocino Art Center, Mendocino CA (paintings & reliefs)
2012   "Taiji Arita Memorial Retrospective & Group Show" Odd Fellows Hall, Mendocino CA (sketches, paintings & sculptures)

Permanent collections
Tokyo Metropolitan Museum of Photography
Sapporo Art Park (Sapporo)

Publications showing Arita's works

"First Born", serialized in Camera Mainichi, May 1973 – February 1975.
Shōji Yamagishi, ed. Japan: A Self-Portrait. New York: International Center of Photography, 1979.  / . (This should not be confused with the 2004 book Japan, a Self-Portrait: Photographs 1945–1964, ed. Osamu Hiraki and Keiichi Takeuchi.)
Rasha no mori: Arita Taiji, 1981–1987 / The Forest of the Naked: Taiji Arita, 1981–1987. Tokyo: Libro Port, 1988. . A book of paintings.
Nihon no shashin, 1970 jidai: Tōketsu sareta "toki" no kioku / Japanese Photography in the 1970s: Memories Frozen in Time. Tokyo: Tokyo Metropolitan Museum of Photography, 1991.  Pp. 98–107.
Nihon nūdo meisakushū (Japanese nudes). Camera Mainichi bessatsu. Tokyo: Mainichi Shinbunsha, 1982.   Pp. 246–47.
PURE Taiji Arita in California: Life & Work: Blurb Books, 2012,  ed. Inga Peterson and Jason Cowan. A photographic chronicle of Arita's daily life & artwork from 1991-2011.

Notes

Japanese photographers
People from Kitakyushu
1941 births
2011 deaths
Commercial photographers